Clarence Russell may refer to:

 Clarence W. Russell (died 1919), American football, basketball, and baseball coach
 Clarence D. Russell (1895–1963), American cartoonist